Hans Schwarzenbach (24 May 1913 – 18 September 1993) was a Swiss equestrian. He was born in Langnau im Emmental. He won silver medal in team eventing at the 1960 Summer Olympics in Rome, together with Anton Bühler and Rudolf Günthardt. He also competed at the 1952 Summer Olympics.

References

1913 births
1993 deaths
Olympic silver medalists for Switzerland
Equestrians at the 1952 Summer Olympics
Swiss male equestrians
Equestrians at the 1960 Summer Olympics
Olympic medalists in equestrian
Medalists at the 1960 Summer Olympics
Sportspeople from the canton of Bern
20th-century Swiss people